The Haunting is a 1999 American supernatural horror film directed by Jan de Bont, and starring Liam Neeson, Catherine Zeta-Jones, Owen Wilson, and Lili Taylor, with Marian Seldes, Bruce Dern, Todd Field, and Virginia Madsen appearing in supporting roles. Its plot follows a group of people who gather at a sprawling estate in western Massachusetts for an apparent volunteer study on insomnia, only to find themselves plagued by paranormal events connected to the home's grim history. Based on the 1959 novel The Haunting of Hill House by Shirley Jackson, it is the second feature film adaptation of the source material after Robert Wise's 1963 film adaptation of the same name.

Development for The Haunting originally began as a collaboration between filmmaker Steven Spielberg and writer Stephen King, who together began writing a new adaptation of Jackson's novel, largely inspired by Wise's 1963 film version. After creative differences, the project was aborted, with King retooling his screenplay to form the 2002 miniseries Rose Red. Spielberg meanwhile commissioned a new screenplay for the project, written by David Self, to be produced under Spielberg's studio, DreamWorks Pictures. Filming of The Haunting began in the fall of 1998, with some location shoots occurring in England at Harlaxton Manor and Belvoir Castle, though the majority of the film was shot in specially-crafted sets in Los Angeles by esteemed Argentine production designer Eugenio Zanetti.

The Haunting premiered theatrically in North America in July 1999. Though met by largely negative reviews from film critics, it was a financial success, grossing $180 million worldwide against a production budget of $80 million.

Plot
Eleanor "Nell" Vance, an insomniac, has cared for her invalid mother for 11 years, sharing a Boston apartment with her. After her mother dies, Nell's sister Jane and her husband Lou inherit the residence and eject Nell to prepare for a sale. As she faces homelessness, Nell accepts an invitation to participate in an insomnia study by Dr. David Marrow at Hill House, a secluded manor house in the Berkshires of western Massachusetts. At the house, she meets Mr. and Mrs. Dudley, an eccentric pair of caretakers. Two other participants arrive: Luke Sanderson and the glamorous Theodora ("Theo"), along with Dr. Marrow and his two research assistants. Unknown to the participants, Dr. Marrow's true purpose is to study the psychological response to fear, intending to expose his subjects to terror.

During their first night, Dr. Marrow relates the story of Hill House: Its original owner, Hugh Crain, a 19th-century textile tycoon, constructed the rambling home for his wife Renee, hoping to populate it with a large family. Unfortunately, all of Crain's children were stillborns, and Renee, devastated by the multiple losses, killed herself, while Crain became a recluse. Marrow's assistant is severely wounded in a freak accident and both research assistants leave for the hospital. Supernatural events begin happening, and Nell sees the ghosts of children. A large portrait of Hugh Crain is vandalized with the words "Welcome Home Eleanor" written in blood. Theo and Luke accuse Nell, claiming she is seeking attention.

Nell becomes determined to prove that the house is haunted. She finds Crain's hidden office and learns that he extensively used child labor in his cotton mills. He tortured and killed several orphans in his home, then burned their bodies in the fireplace. She surmises that these children's spirits are trapped in the house, providing Crain with an "eternal family". Crain had a second wife named Carolyn, from whom Nell is descended. Dr. Marrow is skeptical of Nell's claims and soon reveals his true fear study to the group, but after a statue tries to drown him, he realizes Hill House is haunted. Nell later reveals to the group that she is related to Carolyn Crain and must help the children "move on" to the afterlife.

Dr. Marrow demands that everyone leave Hill House, but Hugh Crain's ghost traps them inside. Luke defaces a portrait of Crain, enraging his spirit to decapitate Luke. When Crain himself manifests, Dr. Marrow and Theo hide in the house while Nell distracts him. Realizing that he thrived on the fear he created in children, Nell declares she is not afraid of him. Her declaration weakens the ghost and he is cast into a decorative bronze door depicting distressed children in a purgatory-like scene. He drags Nell with him, but the spirits release her and she dies. Nell’s soul, along with those of the freed children, rises to heaven.

The following morning, Dr. Marrow and Theo meet the Dudleys at the front gate, where Mr. Dudley asks the doctor if he found out what he wanted to know. Dr. Marrow and Theo leave without saying a word, and leave Hill House behind.

Cast

Production

Development

Filmmaker Steven Spielberg approached horror author Stephen King in 1996 about making a haunted house film, and the two agreed that Robert Wise's 1963 film The Haunting was a benchmark of cinematic house horror. After collaborating on a screenplay partly based on Wise's film (an adaptation of the Shirley Jackson novel The Haunting of Hill House), Spielberg and King ran into creative differences, and the project was ultimately aborted. Spielberg pushed forward with the project, commissioning first-time screenwriter David Self to write a screenplay for the film. King went on to retool his rendition of the material into the 2002 miniseries Rose Red, which shares some elements of both Wise's 1963 film, as well as Jackson's source novel.

While Jan de Bont was working on post-production for Twister, Spielberg offered to take over directing duties on Minority Report in exchange for directing The Haunting. de Bont did not want the film to be a remake of the 1963 version, as he wanted to focus more on the book that it was adapted from.

Filming

Principal photography began on November 30, 1998, and ended on April 9, 1999. Harlaxton Manor, in England, was used as the exterior of Hill House while its Great Hall served as the games room scene where Marrow comforts Nell after seeing the bloodied "Welcome Home Eleanor" writing and where Nell reveals of Hugh Crain's crimes, with the kitchen and pantry scenes done at Belvoir Castle. Spielberg stayed at Stapleford Park Hotel, the actors were at Belton Woods Hotel, north of Grantham, and the film crew were at the Swallow Hotel on the A607 junction on the bypass, and the Olde Barn Hotel in Marston, Lincolnshire.

The majority of the interior sets were built inside the dome-shaped hangar that once housed Hughes H-4 Hercules, near the permanently docked  steamship, in Long Beach, California. The handcrafted interior sets cost an estimated $8–10 million to construct, and were designed by Argentine production designer Eugenio Zanetti.

The film was burdened by reshoots, in part because cinematographer Caleb Deschanel left over creative differences one week into filming. The studio also demanded a new ending be shot, which was completed in June 1999.

Post-production
Following principal photography, the film's elaborate visual effects were completed by Phil Tippett, who had previously provided effects work on Jurassic Park (1993).

Release

Box office
The Haunting opened theatrically in North America on July 23, 1999, screening in 2,808 theaters, and earning $33,435,140 during its opening weekend. The film remained in theatrical release until November 1999. It ultimately grossed $91,411,151 in North America, and $85,900,000 in international markets, making for a worldwide gross of $177,311,151.

Critical response
The Haunting was largely met with unfavorable reviews from film critics, with many citing its weak screenplay, its heavy reliance on horror clichés, and its overdone CGI effects. Rotten Tomatoes gave the film a rating of 17% from 100 reviews, with the critical consensus stating: "Sophisticated visual effects fail to offset awkward performances and an uneven script". Audiences polled by CinemaScore gave the film an average grade of "C+" on an A+ to F scale.

Roger Ebert gave the film a positive review, praising the production design in particular: "To my surprise, I find myself recommending The Haunting based on its locations, its sets, its art direction, its sound design, and the overall splendor of its visuals. The story is a mess, but for long periods that hardly matters. It's beside the point, as we enter one of the most striking spaces I've ever seen in a film." Similar sentiments were echoed by The New York Timess Janet Maslin, who deemed the film "a lavish illustration of how to take a fairly modest black-and-white horror film from 1963 and amplify it so relentlessly that the sight of the flying cow in Twister would not be all that amiss...  the film's spooky tricks are orchestrated by top-notch behind-the-scenes talent, who augment Mr. De Bont's tireless efforts to keep things moving."

Accolades
It was nominated for five Razzie Awards but lost all five to Wild Wild West.

Home media
The Haunting was released on VHS and DVD by DreamWorks Home Entertainment on November 23, 1999. Following Paramount Pictures' acquisition of DreamWorks, Paramount reissued the film on DVD in October 2017.

In October 2020, Paramount released the film on Blu-ray featuring a new 4K restoration under their "Paramount Presents" Blu-ray line. On February 27, 2023, Scream Factory announced a forthcoming 4K UHD Blu-ray release scheduled for May 30, 2023.

See also
 List of ghost films

References

External links

 
 
 
 
 

1999 films
1999 horror films
1999 fantasy films
1990s ghost films
1990s mystery films
1990s psychological horror films
American fantasy films
American haunted house films
American mystery films
American psychological horror films
American supernatural horror films
American remakes of British films
Child abuse in fiction
DreamWorks Pictures films
Filicide in fiction
Films based on American horror novels
Films directed by Jan de Bont
Films scored by Jerry Goldsmith
Films set in country houses
Films set in Massachusetts
Films shot in Lincolnshire
Horror film remakes
Insomnia in film
Films with screenplays by Michael Tolkin
Films based on works by Shirley Jackson
1990s English-language films
1990s American films